NGC 398 is a lenticular galaxy located in the constellation Pisces. It was discovered on October 28, 1886 by Guillaume Bigourdan. It was described by Dreyer as "very faint, very small, stellar."

References

External links
 

0398
18861028
Pisces (constellation)
004090